Uryush-Bitullino (Üreş-Bitulla) is a rural locality (a village) in Uryush-Bittulinsky Selsoviet, Karaidelsky District, Bashkortostan, Russia. The population was 126 as of 2010. There are 5 streets.

Geography 
Uryush-Bitullino is located 52 km southwest of Karaidel (the district's administrative centre) by road. Imyanovo is the nearest rural locality.

References 

Rural localities in Karaidelsky District